Harrison Building may refer to:

Himmelberger and Harrison Building, Cape Girardeau, Missouri, listed on the NRHP in Cape Girardeau County, Missouri
Harrison Apartment Building, Washington, D.C., NRHP-listed

See also
Harrison House (disambiguation)
Harrison County Courthouse (disambiguation)
Harrison High School (disambiguation)
Harrison School (disambiguation)
Harris Building (disambiguation)